Camille Choquier (born 25 September 1941) is a French former professional football player and manager.

Career 
During his career as a player, he played for Abbeville, Épinal, Stade Saint-Germain, and its successor, Paris Saint-Germain. He coached Paris Saint-Germain, Amiens, Melun, Poissy, Racing 92, Corbeil-Essonnes, Les Lilas, and the France police national team.

During his manager years, Choquier would occasionally venture out into different roles. In 1985, he briefly became technical director at PSG. From 1987 to 1988, he worked as a scout for Mantes. From 2001 to 2003, he was coordinator of scouting for Paris Saint-Germain in the Île-de-France region.

After football 
In 2004, Choquier became a member of the Direction Technique Nationale. He would later become a member of the UNECATEF union.

Honours

Player 
Paris Saint-Germain

 Division 2: 1970–71

Manager 
Les Lilas

 Division d'Honneur Paris: 1994–95

 Championnat de France Amateur 2:

References

External links

 

1941 births
Living people
Sportspeople from Somme (department)
French footballers
SC Abbeville players
SAS Épinal players
Stade Saint-Germain players
Paris Saint-Germain F.C. players
Ligue 1 players
Ligue 2 players
French football managers
Paris Saint-Germain F.C. managers
Amiens SC managers
Racing Club de France Football managers
AS Corbeil-Essonnes (football) managers
Association football goalkeepers
French Division 3 (1971–1993) players
Championnat de France Amateur (1935–1971) players
Footballers from Hauts-de-France